Michel Bouvard (born 17 March 1955 in Argenteuil, Val-d'Oise) is a member of the National Assembly of France.  He represents the Savoie department and is a member of the Union for a Popular Movement.

References

1955 births
Living people
People from Argenteuil
Politicians from Île-de-France
Rally for the Republic politicians
Union for a Popular Movement politicians
Debout la France politicians
Deputies of the 10th National Assembly of the French Fifth Republic
Deputies of the 11th National Assembly of the French Fifth Republic
Deputies of the 12th National Assembly of the French Fifth Republic
Deputies of the 13th National Assembly of the French Fifth Republic
Members of Parliament for Savoie